J.T. Roberts was born in January 8, 1978. He is a retired American soccer player who played professionally in the USISL.

Youth
In 1993, Roberts graduated from Princeton High School.  He attended Northern Kentucky University, playing on the men's soccer team from 1993 to 1996.  He was a 1996 NCAA Division II Second Team All American and is a member of the NKU Athletic Hall of Fame.

Professional
On February 2, 1997, the New England Revolution selected J.T. in the third round (twenty-sixth overall) of the 1997 MLS College Draft. On March 6, 1997, the Revolution waived Roberts. He then signed with the Cincinnati Riverhawks of the USISL A-League. He played for the Riverhawks through the 1999 season, then again in 2001.

Administration
In 2003, Roberts coached the Northern Kentucky TC Stars during its single season of existence in the W-League.  Roberts has served as the general manager of the Cincinnati Kings.

References

1975 births
Living people
American soccer coaches
American soccer players
Cincinnati Riverhawks players
USL W-League (1995–2015) coaches
USL League Two players
A-League (1995–2004) players
New England Revolution draft picks
Association football forwards
Association football midfielders